Laurel Hill Cemetery is a cemetery in Philadelphia, Pennsylvania.

Laurel Hill Cemetery may also refer to:

 Laurel Hill Cemetery, Omaha, Nebraska
 Laurel Hill Cemetery (Saco, Maine)
 Laurel Hill Cemetery (San Francisco)

See also
West Laurel Hill Cemetery, in  Bala Cynwyd, Pennsylvania
Laurel Hill (disambiguation)